The 2009 Syracuse Orange football team represented Syracuse University during the 2009 NCAA Division I FBS football season. The Orange were coached by Doug Marrone and played their home games at the Carrier Dome in Syracuse, New York. The Orange finished the season 4–8 and 1–6 in Big East play.

Schedule

Roster

References

Syracuse
Syracuse Orange football seasons
Syracuse Orange football